Siddharth Menon may refer to:

 Siddharth Menon (singer), Malayalam singer and actor
 Siddharth Menon (actor), Marathi and Hindi film actor

See also 
 Siddhartha (disambiguation), for others with similar name